The 1970 Men's EuroHockey Nations Championship was the inaugural edition of the Men's EuroHockey Nations Championship, the quadrennial international men's field hockey championship of Europe organized by the European Hockey Federation. It was held from 19 to 27 September 1970 in Brussels, Belgium.

West Germany won the first-ever European championship by defeating the Netherlands 3–1 in the final. Spain won the bronze medal by defeating France 2–1.

The top four teams qualified for the 1971 Men's Hockey World Cup.

Preliminary round

Pool A

Pool B

Pool C

Pool D

Playoff

Classification round

17th to 19th place classification

Ninth to 16th place classification

13th to 16th place classification

First to eighth place classification

Fifth to eighth place classification

Final standings

 Qualified for the 1971 World Cup

References

Todor66.com

Men's EuroHockey Nations Championship
EuroHockey Nations Championship
EuroHockey Nations Championship
Sport in Brussels
EuroHockey Nations Championship
International field hockey competitions hosted by Belgium
1970s in Brussels